The Commissioner of Police of the Metropolis is the head of London's Metropolitan Police Service. Sir Mark Rowley was appointed to the post on 8 July 2022 after Dame Cressida Dick announced her resignation in February 2022.

The rank of Commissioner of the Metropolitan Police is regarded as the highest in United Kingdom policing, although the incumbent's authority is generally confined to the Metropolitan Police Service's area of operation: the Metropolitan Police District. However, unlike other territorial police forces, the Metropolitan Police has certain national responsibilities such as leading counter-terrorism policing and the protection of the Royal Family and senior members of His Majesty's Government.

Furthermore,  the Commissioner is directly accountable to the Home Secretary, the Mayor's Office for Policing and Crime, and the Mayor of London, and must answer to Londoners and the public nationally. By contrast, all other UK forces (except the City of London Police) are headed by a Chief Constable, accountable only to residents, the local Police and Crime Commissioner, police authority or an elected mayor.

History
The post of commissioner was created by the Metropolitan Police Act 1829.  For the force's first ten years, commissioners were known as "justices of the peace of the counties of Middlesex, Surrey, Hertford, Essex, and Kent, and of all the liberties therein"; Section 4 of the Metropolitan Police Act 1839 first gave the post the title of Commissioner, and it was held jointly by two officers until the Metropolitan Police Act 1856 merged these into a single post. The Commissioners were not appointed as sworn constables until the Administration of Justice Act 1973  amended the phrase on justices of the peace in Section 1 of the 1829 Act to "a Commissioner of Police of the Metropolis to execute the duties of chief officer of the [Metropolitan Police]".

The insignia of rank is a crown above a Bath Star, known as a "pip", above crossed tipstaves within a wreath, very similar to the insignia worn by a full general in the British Army. This badge is all but unique within the British police, shared only with the Commissioner of the City of London Police, the smallest territorial police force, and HM Chief Inspector of Constabulary. Like all chief officer ranks in the British police, commissioners wear gorget patches on the collars of their tunics. The gorget patches are similar to those worn by generals, aside from being of silver-on-black instead of the Army's gold-on-red. 

At one time, the commissioners were either retired military officers or civil servants. Sir John Nott-Bower, who served as Commissioner from 1953 to 1958, was the first career police officer to hold the post, despite several previous Commissioners having served in senior administrative positions in colonial forces and the Metropolitan Police itself.  Nott-Bower's successor Sir Joseph Simpson was the first Commissioner to have started his career at the lowest rank of Constable. However, Sir Robert Mark, appointed in 1972, was the first to have risen through all the ranks from the lowest to the highest, as all his successors have done.

, the post of commissioner is appointed for a period of five years. Applicants are appointed to the post by the monarch, following a recommendation by the Home Secretary under the Police Act 1996.

Eligibility and accountability
The post of commissioner is "accountable to the Home Secretary; to the Mayor's Office for Policing and Crime, and must answer to Londoners and the public nationally." In 2008 and 2011, applicants to the post of Commissioner had to be British citizens (in 2008 this was explicitly stated to be because of the role of the commissioner in national security), and be "serving UK chief constables or of equivalent UK ranks and above, or have recent experience at these levels". In contrast, applicants in 2018 were told that the post of Commissioner was "non reserved" (seemingly a reference to the Aliens’ Employment Act 1955 (as amended)) and that there were no specific restrictions on nationality.

The requirement to be a British national blocked the appointment of non-British commissioners in the past, such as in August 2011, when Prime Minister David Cameron wanted former Los Angeles Police Department Chief Bill Bratton to become the new commissioner. However, in 2014 section 42 of the Police Reform and Social Responsibility Act 2011 was amended by section 140 of the Anti-Social Behaviour, Crime and Policing Act 2014, whereby a person who is or has been "a constable in any part of the United Kingdom" or "a police officer in an approved overseas police force, of at least the approved rank" could be appointed. Determinations made in 2018 under Regulation 11 of the Police Regulations 2003 restrict the constables eligible for appointment to those who are serving, or have served, in the ranks of assistant chief constable, Commander, or a more senior rank in a police force in any part of the United Kingdom. The Appointment of Chief Officers of Police (Overseas Police Forces) Regulations 2014 approve certain Australian, Canadian, New Zealand and US police forces and ranks.

The selection process in 2017, to select Sir Bernard Hogan-Howe's successor, involved the candidates undergoing psychometric testing in addition to interviews with the Home Secretary, Mayor of London and Policing Minister. The process is conducted in private and the Home Office has specifically called for a "news blackout". The discussion and public profile of the candidates was limited to speculation and rumour, with the Home Office refusing to even confirm the shortlisted candidates covered in the media.

The Centre for Public Safety has recommended the selection process be reformed, to provide opportunities for greater public, community and workforce engagement in the process. In particular, suggesting a series of community interview panels and a public candidate forum – though they maintain that the final decision should still rest with the Home Secretary.

List of commissioners

See also
Police ranks of the United Kingdom

Notes

References

External links
 Metropolitan Police Service timeline

Ranks in the Metropolitan Police
 
1829 establishments in England